You Turn Me On is the sixth album by the American band Beat Happening, released in 1992. The band supported the album with a North American tour.

Production
The album was produced by Stuart Moxham, of Young Marble Giants, and Steve Fisk. As with every Beat Happening album, it was Calvin Johnson's goal to write the perfect pop song. The band employed multitrack recording and extended many of the songs.

Critical reception

Rolling Stone wrote that, "as with any truly good rock band, it's vision—not mere chops—that drives their engine... The group's songs combine the spooky-sparse quality of early rockabilly with the naive sound of Sixties teen-beat pop." The Washington Post stated that the "do-it-yourself tunes combine the irresistible hummability of bubblegum with the stripped-down dirges of punk."

AllMusic deemed the album "a mature record of tremendous breadth and complexity" and "a masterpiece."

Track listing
All tracks written by Beat Happening.

 "Tiger Trap" – 6:53
 "Noise" – 3:23
 "Pinebox Derby" – 3:07
 "Teenage Caveman" – 4:35
 "Sleepy Head" – 4:07
 "You Turn Me On" – 4:10
 "Godsend" – 9:28
 "Hey Day" – 3:25
 "Bury the Hammer" – 6:04

References

Beat Happening albums
1992 albums
K Records albums
Albums produced by Steve Fisk